The 2003 Houston Cougars football team, also known as the Houston Cougars, Houston, or UH represented the University of Houston in the 2003 NCAA Division I-A football season.  It was the 58th year of season play for Houston. The team was coached by first year head football coach, Art Briles.  The team played its home games at Robertson Stadium, a 32,000-person capacity stadium on-campus in Houston.

Schedule

References

Houston
Houston Cougars football seasons
Houston Cougars football